Lucas Ordóñez Martín-Esperanza (born May 1, 1985) is a Spanish racecar driver, who entered professional racing by winning a spot in a PlayStation 3 Gran Turismo competition. Racing for Nissan in the 2009 GT4 European Cup season, he secured a podium finish in his first event. Two race wins towards the end of the season secured him joint second place overall.

In 2011 he and his team came in 2nd in their class in the 24 Hours of Le Mans.

Ordonez began 2012 by taking the role of lead driver in Nissan's 'all-gamer car' at the Dubai 24 Hours. The team finished on the podium. He will compete in the European Le Mans Series and Le Mans 24 Hours for Greaves Motorsport.

For the 2012 24 Hours Nürburgring race, driving the #123 car with Kazunori Yamauchi, he finished 1st in the SP 8T class, and 30th overall.

Racing record

24 Hours of Le Mans results

FIA GT Series results

* Season still in progress.

Complete Super GT results
(key) (Races in bold indicate pole position) (Races in italics indicate fastest lap)

References

External links
 
 

1985 births
Living people
Spanish racing drivers
24 Hours of Le Mans drivers
FIA World Endurance Championship drivers
Blancpain Endurance Series drivers
Super GT drivers
24 Hours of Spa drivers
Japanese Formula 3 Championship drivers
GT Academy participants
Signature Team drivers
Greaves Motorsport drivers
Nismo drivers
Kondō Racing drivers
Nürburgring 24 Hours drivers
GT4 European Series drivers
M-Sport drivers
B-Max Racing drivers